The Penn Traffic Company was founded in 1854 in Johnstown, Pennsylvania, as a food service company for stagecoaches.  It eventually became a general-merchandise department store but by the early 1960s had also returned to the food business through the acquisition of Super Value Corporation, operator of the 10-store Riverside supermarket chain.  In 1982, the company sold its department stores and concentrated solely on the food and supermarket business.  A series of financial troubles led to Penn Traffic's Chapter 11 bankruptcy filing in November 2009 and sale of assets to Tops Markets in early 2010.

At the time of sale, Penn Traffic was the parent company for 79 retail supermarkets in the Northeastern United States, concentrating mostly in Central New York.  Its headquarters were in Syracuse, New York.  Penn Traffic formerly had operated supermarkets in Pennsylvania, Vermont and New Hampshire under the Insalaco's, Bi-Lo/Riverside/U-Save, P&C and Quality trade names. The company had also operated a wholesale food distribution business (purchased in 2008 by C&S Wholesale Grocers) serving approximately 121 independent operators.

Origins

Penn Traffic traces its origins back to the 1850s, when it was a trading post in Johnstown, Pennsylvania. Over the years, Penn Traffic evolved first into a general-merchandise department store and later a large retail and wholesale supermarket company. In 1922 it established Johnstown's first radio station, WTAC, which was licensed until early 1926. Riverside, founded in Brookville, Pennsylvania in 1928, became part of the Penn Traffic family in 1962, and began developing the Bi-Lo format in the 1980s (not related to the chain in the Mid-Atlantic).  Penn Traffic operated 43 supermarkets under the Bi-Lo trade name across Pennsylvania, and also distributed food to 51 franchised and independent supermarkets from its DuBois, Pennsylvania distribution facility.  Quality Markets, founded in Jamestown, New York in 1913, joined the Penn Traffic family in 1979. Penn Traffic operated a total of 34 supermarkets under the Quality trade name in southwestern New York and northwestern Pennsylvania.

Penn Traffic's flagship department store in Johnstown, challenged by economic decline, permanently closed after the 1977 flood.  The company sold its six department stores and two women's specialty-store leases to Crown American Corporation, owner of the Hess's department store chain, in 1982 in order to concentrate on the supermarket business.

Acquisition
Miller, Tabak, Hirsch & Company, a New York City investment group, began its takeover bid for Penn Traffic in 1986.  Early takeover attempts were resisted by management but by 1987, Penn Traffic agreed to an offer by an affiliate of the investment firm and the company was briefly taken private for $131 million.  In 1988, under then-chairman Gary Hirsch, Penn Traffic began an acquisition program.  Hirsch first took Penn Traffic public, raising $25 million, and then added Syracuse-based P&C Food Markets for $219 million. In 1989, Penn Traffic acquired Ohio chain Big Bear Stores for $341 million.

P&C Foods
P&C Foods began in 1944 as the Producers and Consumers food cooperative in Ithaca, New York as a way for farmers in Upstate New York to get their products to market efficiently. Until 2010, Penn Traffic operated 70 P&C supermarkets serving the Syracuse metropolitan area as well as many other communities in upstate New York, Vermont, New Hampshire and Pennsylvania. P&C was also a major wholesaler in upstate New York; from its Syracuse warehouse, the company served 99 independent supermarkets in central New York, the majority of which still operate under the Big M franchise trade name.  In 1997 a new ballpark for the Syracuse Chiefs opened.  Penn Traffic owned the naming rights for nine baseball seasons of P & C Stadium.  The last 'P&C Foods' branded grocery store closed on January 21, 2012 in Bath, NY when the building was sold to Moran Foods, Owner of Save-A-Lot by order of the FTC.

Big Bear
When the first Big Bear store opened in 1933, it marked the beginning of self-service supermarket operations in the Midwest. Big Bear was the first supermarket in the country to use cashier-operated motorized conveyor belts and the first to use an IBM mainframe computer.  In the 1980s, its Big Bear Plus stores combined a supermarket with a general merchandise store. Penn Traffic operated 70 Big Bear and Big Bear Plus stores in Ohio and West Virginia until early 2004. As a result of Penn Traffic's 2003 bankruptcy filing, these stores were either closed or sold  to other companies, such as grocery retailer Giant Eagle, while other properties were left vacant and still remain vacant. The Columbus, Ohio warehouses operated by Big Bear were also left vacant and subsequently torn down for redevelopment.

Keeping Up
In the early and middle 1990s Penn Traffic continued to grow as it acquired and built other supermarkets in and near its primary markets. During this time, Penn Traffic entered the Buffalo and Erie markets with the Quality trade name and made substantial investments to enhance its store base and distribution network, while maintaining steady growth in cash flow and profitability.

Phil Hawkins and PR problems
In 1997, Hirsch hired Phil Hawkins, who was credited with saving the Vons supermarket chain in California. Hawkins, forced to cut costs, fired 325 employees, including all five division heads, some with 20 years or more with Penn Traffic.

As CEO, Hawkins replaced USDA Choice meat in its butcher shops with a cheaper grade meat. In an effort to reposition its stores as focused on "value", rather than time-tested formulas within specific markets that had worked for the chains, Hawkins slashed expenses by using generic grocery bags, postponing store maintenance and reducing benefits to employees as well.  In the Columbus market, prices did not uniformly drop and competitors like Kroger and Meijer regularly beat Big Bear in third-party cost comparisons. Customers noticed the changes, and unhappy with what they saw and were experiencing, stopped shopping.

Meanwhile, better-capitalized competitors like Wegmans Food Markets and Kroger cut into market share. Same-store sales fell 8.2% in fiscal 1998, while operating income declined another 6%, to $165 million. In Columbus, where Kroger and Big Bear had once been neck and neck, Big Bear's market share dropped to 20% from 25%, while Kroger's rose to 54% from 44% in 1998, according to a survey by the Columbus Dispatch. Hawkins resigned before the first bankruptcy filing, March 1, 1999.

Financial Troubles & Bankruptcy court
In the late 1990s, Penn Traffic experienced a significant reduction in its profitability because of several merchandising and operational changes that had a negative impact on its business. By late 1998, the company realized that while it had strong consumer franchises, it was working under an untenable debt burden. To address this challenge, in early 1999 Penn Traffic negotiated an agreement with bondholders to restructure more than $1.1 billion in bond debt.

In 1998, Penn Traffic sold its Dairy operation, Sani-Dairy in Johnstown Pennsylvania to Dean Foods.  The dairy provided fluid milk, sour cream, ice cream, novelties, and cottage cheese to Penn Traffic stores and to private label customers.

Penn Traffic completed its financial restructuring in June 1999 with more than 75% of its debt retired.   In 2003 the company filed for bankruptcy again, this time resulting in the loss of Big Bear, one of their largest grocery chains. The move did not come as a surprise to industry insiders as Big Bear was Penn Traffic's albatross ; the chain was often high volume low profit company and officials  realized this too late to save the crown jewel P&C Foods. Joseph V. Fischer was credited for a positive turn in momentum and had moved the company in a positive direction. Joseph V. Fischer resigned one month into the second chapter 11 and was replaced by Steven G. Panagos, a well known corporate turnaround specialist.  Steven Panagos successfully sold the Big Bear division, shuttered unprofitable stores, cut overhead and gave the underfunded pension plan back to the PBGC.  Penn Traffic successfully emerged from bankruptcy a smaller, but healthier company.  Post the chapter 11, Robert Chapman was named the new CEO of Penn Traffic.  Penn Traffic was moved to the S&P 500 in March 2003 only to have a scandal later that year negatively effect all of Fischer diligence.

In 2007, two former Penn Traffic executives were indicted on fraud charges.

In early 2008, Penn Traffic closed its private bakery, Penny Curtiss. The bakery provided bread products for its own stores and other supermarket chains. Penn Traffic cited the loss of the local Aldi stores contract in August 2007 as the primary reason for the bakery's closing.  The company said the bakery was contributing less than 4% of Penn Traffic's total annual revenue.
In December 2008 The Penn Traffic Company entered into a definitive agreement to sell its wholesale business segment to C&S Wholesale Grocers Inc.

On November 18, 2009, Penn Traffic filed for Chapter 11 bankruptcy protection after second-quarter losses of $7 million (the highest loss ever for the company), missed loan payments, and slower shipments from suppliers. Originally, the company intended to sell all of its assets by the end of 2009 and close on the deal or deals by the early January 2010.

As of January 9, 2010 Penn Traffic was entertaining 3 separate bids: $54 million from Price Chopper for 22 P&C Foods stores, a private bid of $36.5 million from a team of professional liquidators for all of P&C's assets and $85 million from Tops Markets for all of Penn Traffic's stores.

Sale to Tops Markets
On January 25, 2010, Tops Markets' bid was signed off by a Federal Judge in US Bankruptcy Court and was awarded the sale of all 79 Penn Traffic stores.  Closing occurred on Jan 29, 2010.  The amount of the sale will be slightly more than the previously agreed upon price of $85 million cash and assumption of approximately $70 million of Penn Traffic's debt.
The BiLo name survives in Pennsylvania as those stores are franchises, though three former locations have since converted to Tops.
The P&C name (P&C Fresh) has been relaunched by three ex-PT executives in Cortland, NY; Ithaca, NY and Sayre, PA (this store has since sold to Tops).

See also
Tops Markets
Kroger
Giant Eagle
Meijer
Save-A-Lot
Aldi

References

External links
 Penn Traffic Company
 P&C Foods
 Bi-Lo/Riverside Markets
 CEO of Big Bear parent firm meets the troops
 Former P&C locations

Companies established in 1854
Defunct supermarkets of the United States
Defunct companies based in Syracuse, New York
Companies disestablished in 2010
Companies that filed for Chapter 11 bankruptcy in 1999
Companies that filed for Chapter 11 bankruptcy in 2003
Companies that filed for Chapter 11 bankruptcy in 2009
1854 establishments in Pennsylvania
2010 disestablishments in New York (state)